Xia Yan is the name of:

Xia Yan (Ming dynasty) (1482–1548), Ming dynasty politician
Xia Yan (playwright) (1900–1995), Chinese playwright, screenwriter and official